Linda Lee may refer to:

People
 Linda Lee (bridge) (born 1947), Canadian bridge champion and co-owner of Master Point Press
 Linda Lee (politician), American politician
 Linda Lee Cadwell (born 1945), American author and widow of the martial-arts star Bruce Lee
 Lee E-jun (born 1969), Taiwanese singer also known as Linda Lee

Fictional characters
 Supergirl, a DC Comics superheroine whose secret identity is Linda Lee Danvers
 Linda Lee, a character in the science fiction novel Neuromancer

See also
 Linda Lee Thomas (1883–1954), American socialite who was married to songwriter Cole Porter
 Lynda Lee-Potter (1935–2004), British journalist